Jonathan Hopkin is Professor in the European Institute and the Department of Government of the London School of Economics and Political Science. He obtained a PhD at the European University Institute in Florence, and lectured at the Universities of Bradford, Durham and Birmingham, joining LSE in 2004. He teaches comparative politics and political economy, and has published in the areas of political parties and elections, political economy, inequality and welfare states.

Hopkin has worked mainly on the development of political parties in contemporary Spain and Italy. His current research, with Mark Blyth of Brown University, examines the reasons for the narrowing of the range of political choices in advanced democracies, a process conceptualized as 'cartelization'.

In 2020 he published a book with Oxford University Press, Anti-System Politics: The Rise of Market Liberalism in Rich Democracies.

References

External links
jonathanhopkin.com

Academics of the London School of Economics
Living people
British political scientists
Year of birth missing (living people)
Place of birth missing (living people)
Academics of the University of Birmingham